King of the Dead is a fantasy novel by Gene DeWeese, set in the world of Ravenloft, and is based on the Dungeons & Dragons role-playing game. It was published in March 1996.

Plot summary
The story concerns itself with Azalin, the king of the title. Despite the near-limitless powers that are now his to command, he is continually haunted by the death of his son. Unable to find any kind of happiness or contentment, he has begun to hate the dark, horror-filled world that is his to rule. King of the Dead recounts the tale of Azalin's earlier existence as a powerful mage and the events that led to his current reign.

Reception
Andy Butcher reviewed King of the Dead for Arcane magazine, rating it an 8 out of 10 overall. He commented that "Gene De Weese is yet another New York Times best-selling author who has been persuaded by TSR to write an AD&D-based novel. The experience gained from over three dozen previously published horror, science fiction and non-fiction books has stood him in pretty good stead, and King of the Dead joins the ever-growing number of Ravenloft novels that are genuinely horrific." He added that "Weese's clever manipulation of time and the order of events gives the reader just enough information to engender a sense of eerie foreboding and the awful inevitability of fate, without allowing the story to become predictable and boring - thankfully, you never really know what to expect next. King of the Dead is a dark novel which relies, for the most part, on its skillfully crafted atmosphere, a technique which lends greater impact to the few graphically disturbing scenes." Butcher concluded his review by saying, "Although the story itself is of little direct use for a referee looking to steal some ideas, it's nevertheless well worth a look for any fans of horror games - Ravenloft or otherwise - due to its skillfully crafted atmosphere. There are elements here that could be used to great effect in almost any horror game you care to mention, and you'll get an extremely good read into the bargain. Good stuff and highly recommended."

Reviews
Review by Don D'Ammassa (1996) in Science Fiction Chronicle, #190 October 1996

References

1996 novels
Novels by Gene DeWeese
Ravenloft novels